Nakuru West Constituency is a former electoral constituency in Kenya. It was renamed to Molo Constituency in 1988.

Members of Parliament

References 

Constituencies in Rift Valley Province

1963 establishments in Kenya

Constituencies disestablished in 1988

Nakuru County
Nakuru
Constituencies established in 1963
Former constituencies of Kenya